Ivan Prtajin (born 14 May 1996) is a Croatian professional footballer who plays as a forward for Wehen Wiesbaden.

Club career
Prtajin started his career with the youth academy of Primorac. After playing for the youth academies of Arbanasi and Trešnjevka, he moved to the youth team of NK Zagreb at the age of 16. After two seasons with the youth team, he moved to Italian club Udinese in 2014 where he was assigned to Udinese Primavera (the reserve team). He made a total of 49 appearances for the reserves and scored 22 goals. His only involvement with the first team was being an unused substitute in a 4–3 defeat against Cagliari Calcio.

By the end of 2016, Prtajin started training with Croatian club Hajduk Split. He featured in a number of friendlies for the club. In one of the friendlies against Jadran, he scored four goals. He finally signed for the club on 18 January 2017. He made his debut for the club in a 2–1 victory over Slaven Belupo where he substituted Ante Erceg in the extra time.

Personal life
In July 2017, a fire broke out in Dugopolje, a city where Hajduk Split players trained. Prtajin, along with Toma Bašić, Josip Juranović, Zvonimir Milić and Jerko Šeparović, joined the firefighters in extinguishing the fire.

References

External links
 

1996 births
Living people
Sportspeople from Zadar
Association football forwards
Croatian footballers
Croatia youth international footballers
HNK Hajduk Split players
HNK Hajduk Split II players
NK Dugopolje players
Roda JC Kerkrade players
FC Schaffhausen players
NK Olimpija Ljubljana (2005) players
SV Wehen Wiesbaden players
Croatian Football League players
Second Football League (Croatia) players
First Football League (Croatia) players
Eerste Divisie players
Swiss Challenge League players
Slovenian PrvaLiga players
3. Liga players
Croatian expatriate footballers
Croatian expatriate sportspeople in Italy
Croatian expatriate sportspeople in the Netherlands
Croatian expatriate sportspeople in Switzerland
Croatian expatriate sportspeople in Slovenia
Croatian expatriate sportspeople in Germany
Expatriate footballers in Italy
Expatriate footballers in the Netherlands
Expatriate footballers in Switzerland
Expatriate footballers in Slovenia
Expatriate footballers in Germany